Kuheli (Bengali: কুহেলী) is a 1971 Bengali suspense thriller movie directed by Tarun Majumdar. The film stars Biswajit Chatterjee, Chhaya Devi, Sumita Sanyal Ajitesh Bandopadhyay, Satya Bandyopadhyay, Shekhar Chatterjee, Utpal Dutt, Sandhya Roy, Debashree Roy, Rabi Ghosh and Subhendu Chatterjee. Music director of the movie was Hemanta Mukherjee.

Plot 
A woman named Sheba Mitra comes to a remote hill town, Nijhumgarh to be the governess of girl child Ranu. Shankar Roy, the owner of the almost haunted bungalow called Raykuthi. Ranu is his only child. Sheba came to know everything is going mysterious surrounding her. She tried to know the history about the Bungalow and the dwellers and started investigation secretly. Old family friend Dr. Choudhury and Shankar's cousine Satyabhusan were very much related with the family. Sheba suddenly knew that two murders took place there nearly seven years earlier. She watched that mysterious incidents are happening. A lady like Shankar's deceased wife sings and walks in the adjacent jungle almost every night to attract the girl child and his father Shankar. Now Sheba could only pray for it to Go Away as incidents transcend the rules of our physical world. It revealed that the main culprit is one very close and trusted to the family.

Cast 
 Biswajit Chatterjee as Shankar Roy
 Sandhya Roy as Aparna and her twin
 Debashree Roy as Ranu
 Sumita Sanyal as Sheba Mitra
Chhaya Devi as Manada di
Ajitesh Bandopadhyay as Satyabhusan
 Satya Bandyopadhyay as Dr. Choudhury
Shekhar Chatterjee as the station master
Utpal Dutt as the lawyer
Tarun Roy
 Rabi Ghosh as Lakkhan, the old spy servant of the family
Subhendu Chatterjee
Mrinal Mukherjee
Nirmal Ghosh

Soundtrack 

The soundtrack is composed by Hemanta Mukherjee.

References

External links
 

Bengali-language Indian films
Indian detective films
Indian crime thriller films
1970s crime thriller films
1970s Bengali-language films